The church of San Marcuola is a religious building facing the Grand Canal and located in the sestiere of Cannaregio in Venice, Italy. It is dedicated to the saints Hermagoras and Fortunatus ("Marcuola" is a Venetian contraction of "Ermacora"). Palazzo Memmo Martinengo Mandelli is a neighboring building.

History
The present church was first erected in the 12th century. Major reconstruction was designed by Antonio Gaspari, and completed in 1730-1736 by Giorgio Massari. The facade was never completed. The church has a large collection of statues by  Gaetano Susali, and paintings by Francesco Migliori. It has a Last Supper by  Jacopo Tintoretto on the left side of the apse.

For the right side, Tintoretto painted Christ Washing the Disciples' Feet but it is now at either Museo del Prado in Madrid or the Shipley Art Gallery.

Its place at San Marcuola is occupied now by a copy by Carlo Ridolfi.

The grave of 18th century German composer Johann Adolph Hasse is located in San Marcuola. 

The church gives its name to the San Marcuola vaporetto stop on the Grand Canal.

Sources

External links
 Churches of Venice

Roman Catholic churches in Venice
18th-century Roman Catholic church buildings in Italy
Baroque architecture in Venice
Roman Catholic churches completed in 1736
12th-century establishments in Italy